Khashkala (also Romanized as Khashkalā; also known as Khoshk Kolā) is a village in Langarud Rural District, Salman Shahr District, Abbasabad County, Mazandaran Province, Iran. At the 2006 census, its population was 204, in 56 families.

References 

Populated places in Abbasabad County